Marshallora is a genus of gastropods belonging to the family Triphoridae.

The genus has almost cosmopolitan distribution.

Species:

Marshallora adversa 
Marshallora bubistae 
Marshallora gutta 
Marshallora mariangelae 
Marshallora modesta 
Marshallora nicaraguensis 
Marshallora nichupte 
Marshallora nigrocincta 
Marshallora ostenta

References

Gastropods